José Herrero Berrendero (born 11 January 1934) is a former Spanish racing cyclist. He finished in last place in the 1960 Tour de France.

References

External links

1934 births
Living people
Spanish male cyclists
Cyclists from Madrid